Type 9 (also, Type N, T9, or T-9) is a gearbox from Ford that was used in Ford Capri 1.6, 2.0 1984 onwards, Capri 2.8 1983 onwards, Ford Sierra 1.6, 1.8, 2.0, Sierra XR4i, Sierra XR4x4 2.8 and the Scorpio 4x4 as well as the US market Merkur XR4Ti and Merkur Scorpio.

The Type 9 was Ford's first five-speed, rear-wheel-drive gearbox, and it is based on the four-speed Type E gearbox. The fifth, or overdrive gear, was added to the four-speed gearbox by placing it in the extension housing or tailshaft housing. This made production easier and cheaper but effectively limited torque capacity to 200 lb. ft. or so.

The Type 9 is a popular choice for five-speed conversions of older Ford cars such as the Cortina and rear wheel drive Escorts, and also for kit car builders, since it comes with a separate bell housing so it can be easily swapped around. Engines that were originally in FWD layouts are fitted to these transmissions so that they can go into a RWD layout, as in a hot rod engine swap or kit car. The gearbox has a  23-spline input shaft, and the main gear housing is cast iron with a cast aluminum tailshaft housing. 

Overall, the T-9 is an excellent transmission for vehicles with lower power levels and lighter weight. However, in applications that require more power, the T-9 is frequently replaced with the stronger Borg-Warner T-5 transmission.

References 
 Ford Type 9 5 speed gearbox overview

Type 9